Yalachigere is a village in Tumakuru district, Karnataka, India. Most of the people here are farmers or teachers. Raagi, groundnut and mango are grown here.

References

 

Villages in Tumkur district